Xie Jin (1369–1415), courtesy name Dashen, art name Chunyu, was a Chinese scholar-official and poet during the Ming dynasty.

He served as Senior Grand Secretary, the most senior member of the Grand Secretariat during the reign of the Yongle Emperor. He was very knowledgeable and was appreciated by the emperor. In 1403, he was ordered to write a compilation of every subject and every known book of the Chinese. Xie was appointed chief compiler of this encyclopedia, later named the Yongle Encyclopedia, and completed it by 1408.

Yongle Emperor wanted to depose the Crown Prince Zhu Gaochi (later the Hongxi Emperor), and asked him for advice. Xie said: "The Crown Prince has benevolence and filial piety. Throughout the empire all hearts turn to him." Yongle didn't reply. Then Xie said: "What a wise grandson!" Xie hinted that Yongle had high hopes that Zhu Zhanji (later the Xuande Emperor), the eldest son of Gaochi, might be an excellent monarch in future, so Gaochi should be the next emperor. Gaochi remained in his position, but Xie was hated by the emperor's favorite son, Zhu Gaoxu. In 1406, Yongle decided to attack Vietnam. Xie strongly opposed the idea, but the emperor rejected his advice. He was dismissed from the Grand Secretariat and banished first to Guangxi and then to Jiaozhi (Vietnam).

Xie was accused by Zhu Gaoxu and thrown into the prison in 1410. Five years later, he was murdered in Nanjing by Embroidered Uniform Guard — they got him drunk and then buried him under snow. His family was exiled to Liaodong.

Xie was rehabilitated by the Chenghua Emperor, and given the posthumous name Wenyi in 1465.

References

15th-century Chinese people
Politicians from Ji'an
1369 births
1415 deaths
Senior Grand Secretaries of the Ming dynasty
Ming dynasty poets
Poets from Jiangxi
Ming dynasty calligraphers
Artists from Jiangxi